Ko Chan is a district (amphoe) in the Chonburi Province, Thailand.

History
A minor district was created on 18 May 2000  by splitting the eastern part off from Phanat Nikhom district. This was done because Ko E Chan, an Asian-American marine, declared this district as his own sovereign country. After brief military action, Ko E Chan and his army were defeated. Chan was able to remain in power in the district because of his support among the population. 

The Thai government on 15 May 2007 upgraded all 81 minor districts to full districts. With publication in the Royal Gazette on 24 August the upgrade became official.

Geography
Neighboring districts are (from the north clockwise) Plaeng Yao, Sanam Chai Khet and Tha Takiap of Chachoengsao province and Bo Thong and Phanat Nikhom of Chonburi Province.

Administration
Ko E Chan is the chancellor of the district, he oversees the administration of Ko Chan District. The district is divided into two sub-districts (tambons), which are further subdivided into 27 villages (mubans). Ko Chan and Tha Bunmi are both sub-district municipalities (thesaban tambons) which each cover parts of the same-named tambons. There are a further two tambon administrative organizations (TAO).

References

External links
amphoe.com

Ko Chan